The Colombia women's national volleyball team represents Colombia in international competitions in women's volleyball. The squad won its first continental medal at the 1991 edition of the South American Championship.

Results

World Championship

 2022 — 21st place

FIVB World Grand Prix

 1993 to 2014 — did not participate
 2015 — 23rd place
 2016 — 24th place
 2017 — 19th place

FIVB Volleyball Women's Challenger Cup

 2018 —  Silver medal
 2019 — did not qualify
 2022 — 4th place

Pan American Games

 1955 – did not participate
 1959 – did not participate
 1963 – did not participate
 1967 – did not participate
 1971 – 7th place
 1975 – did not participate
 1979 – did not participate
 1983 – did not participate
 1987 – did not participate
 1991 – did not participate
 1995 – did not participate
 1999 – did not participate
 2003 – did not participate
 2007 – did not participate
 2011 – did not participate
 2015 – did not participate
 2019 –  Silver medal

Pan-American Cup

 2002 to 2011 — did not participate
 2012 — 11th place
 2013 — 9th place
 2014 — 7th place
 2015 — 8th place
 2016 — 7th place
 2017 — 7th place
 2018 — 5th place
 2019 —  3rd place
 2021 — did not participate
 2022 —  2nd place

South American Championship

 1951 — did not compete
 1956 — did not compete
 1958 — did not compete
 1961 — did not compete
 1962 — did not compete
 1964 — did not compete
 1967 — did not compete
 1969 — 6th place
 1971 — 7th place
 1973 — 7th place
 1975 — did not compete
 1977 — did not compete
 1979 — did not compete
 1981 — did not compete
 1983 — 5th place
 1985 — 4th place
 1987 — did not compete
 1989 — did not compete
 1991 —  Bronze medal
 1993 — 4th place
 1995 — 5th place
 1997 — 6th place
 1999 — did not compete
 2001 — did not compete
 2003 — 4th place
 2005 — did not compete
 2007 — 6th place
 2009 — 4th place
 2011 — 4th place
 2013 — 4th place
 2015 —  Bronze medal
 2017 —  Silver medal
 2019 —  Silver medal
 2021 —  Silver medal

Bolivarian Games
 2005 — 3rd place

Squads

 2005 Bolivarian Games —  Bronze Medal
 Paola Ampudia, Sandra Montoya, Carolina Bahamon (c), Paula Cortés, Katerine Trejos, Mery Mancilla, Kenny Moreno, Diana Arango, Laura Cadavid, Silvia Lobo, Jessica Angulo and Cindy Ramírez
 2011 South American Championship — 4th place
 Madelaynne Montaño, Jessica Angulo, Cindy Ramírez, Martha Nieva, Lorena Zuleta, Paola Ampudia, Mery Mancilla, Danna Escobar, Kenny Moreno, Estanislada Cuéllar, Paola Cortés and Sandra Montoya.

External links
2016 Team Profile

National women's volleyball teams
volleyball
Volleyball in Colombia